The Round Foundry is a former engineering works off Water Lane in Holbeck, Leeds, West Yorkshire, England. Founded in the late 18th century, the building was developed into the Round Foundry Media Centre in 2005.

History
The Round Foundry was built in 1795–1797 by a partnership of James Fenton (1754–1834), Matthew Murray, David Wood and the financier William Lister, trading as Fenton, Murray and Wood, (later Fenton, Murray and Jackson). It was at the Round Foundry that Matthew Murray made his name as a great engineer. He produced textile machinery, steam engines and the first locomotives for the Middleton Railway including Salamanca. The Round Foundry developed to become one of the world's first specialist engineering foundries. 

Disaster struck in 1875 when fire destroyed some of the original buildings, including the large rotunda that gave the Round Foundry its name. Some buildings were saved, the earliest of which dates from 1798. There are a total of 7 listed buildings in the Round Foundry complex. These include the Dry Sand Foundry, the Green Sand Foundry and 101 Water Lane.

Redevelopment
The first phase of a £30 million redevelopment has led to the creation of the Round Foundry Media Centre, which provides office space for creative and digital media companies. This project also provides restaurants, bars and cafés set in a number of courtyards that try to retain as much of the character of the old foundry as is possible. This redevelopment project has won a number of architectural awards including; 'Best Creative Land Use' and 'Best Urban Centre', Yorkshire Urban Renaissance Awards 2005; 'Project of the Year', RICS Regeneration Awards 2005; 'Excellence in Architecture and Built Environment' and 'Best Commercial, Industrial and Retail', RIBA Yorkshire White Rose Awards 2005.

The Engine House, where the Salamanca was constructed, is now home to a number of businesses including KBW Barristers Chambers, ISG engineering and the Engine House Café.

Foundry buildings

See also
 Railway Foundry
 Listed buildings in Leeds (City and Hunslet Ward - southern area)

References

External links
Matthew Murray Diagram of Marshall's mills and Matthew Murray's engineering works (Round Foundry) at Water Lane. 
Leeds Engine Builders Plan of Round Foundry c.1841, steam engine manufactory of Fenton, Murray and Jackson.

Buildings and structures in Leeds
Listed buildings in Leeds
Grade II* listed buildings in West Yorkshire
Grade II listed buildings in West Yorkshire